The OVW Hardcore Championship was a short-lived hardcore wrestling title in World Wrestling Entertainment's former developmental territory, Ohio Valley Wrestling (OVW). The title was created in 2000 and was deactivated in 2001. Rather than being physically represented by a conventional championship belt, the OVW Hardcore Championship was represented by a trash can.

Title history

List of combined reigns

References

External links
An interview with Randy Orton, conducted by Silvervision
OVW Hardcore Title Champions at Wrestling-Titles.com

Ohio Valley Wrestling championships
Hardcore wrestling championships
Defunct sports competitions
Recurring sporting events established in 2000
Recurring sporting events disestablished in 2001
2000 establishments in Kentucky
2001 disestablishments in Kentucky